Kyran Martin O'Donnell (born 29 October 1958) is a former Australian politician. He was a Liberal member of the Western Australian Legislative Assembly from the 2017 state election to the 2021 state election, representing the district of Kalgoorlie.

O'Donnell was a policeman before entering politics, and in 2013 was elected to Kalgoorlie-Boulder City Council.

At the 2021 state election, O'Donnell was defeated by Labor candidate Ali Kent.

References

1958 births
Living people
Liberal Party of Australia members of the Parliament of Western Australia
Members of the Western Australian Legislative Assembly
Australian police officers
Western Australian local councillors